The men's bantamweight boxing competition at the 2016 Summer Olympics in Rio de Janeiro was held from 10 to 20 August at the Riocentro.

Competition format
Like all Olympic boxing events, the competition was a straight single-elimination tournament. This event consisted of 28 boxers who had qualified for the competition through various qualifying tournaments held in 2015 and 2016. The 2016 medal competition began with a preliminary round on 10 August, where the number of competitors was reduced to 16, and concluded with the final on 20 August. As there were fewer than 32 boxers in the competition, a number of boxers received a bye through the preliminary round. Both semi-final losers were awarded bronze medals.

Schedule 
All times are Brasília Time (UTC−3).

Results

Finals

Nikitin withdrew due an injury sustained in the fight against Conlan.

Top half

Bottom half

References

Boxing at the 2016 Summer Olympics
Men's events at the 2016 Summer Olympics